The 2018 Pan American Gymnastics Championships was held in Lima, Peru, in September, 2018. Three gymnastics disciplines were contested: artistic gymnastics (from September 11 to 16), rhythmic gymnastics (from September 26 to 30) and trampoline (from September 5 to 9). The event was organized by the Peruvian Gymnastics Federation under the supervision of the Pan American Gymnastics Union and the International Gymnastics Federation, and served as qualification for the 2019 Pan American Games, which were also held in Lima, Peru.

Medalists

Artistic gymnastics

Rhythmic gymnastics

Trampoline gymnastics

Medal table

See also
 2018 Junior Pan American Artistic Gymnastics Championships
 2018 Pan American Aerobic Gymnastics Championships

References 

Pan American Gymnastics
Pan American Gymnastics Championships
Pan American Gymnastics Championships
Pan American Gymnastics Championships
International gymnastics competitions hosted by Peru
Qualification tournaments for the 2019 Pan American Games